Lesbian, gay, bisexual, and transgender (LGBT) people in the United States have a long history, including vibrant subcultures and advocacy battles for social and religious acceptance and legal rights.

The 1969 Stonewall riots in New York City are often cited as the beginning of the modern gay civil rights era. The AIDS crisis in the 1980s was a large influence on gay communities and activism. In the late 20th century, social acceptance began to increase, and legal rights followed.

Military policy was changed in 2011, allowing LGB people to serve openly. Social conservatives briefly had success outlawing same-sex marriage at the state level in the 2000s, but the U.S. Supreme Court legalized same-sex marriage nationwide in 2015.

History

There are varying accounts of the place LGBT people occupied in pre-Columbian era Native American tribes. In modern parlance, the term Two-Spirit is often used to describe Native American LGBT people. There were (and are) hundreds of different tribes across the US, each with its own culture, thus acknowledgement and acceptance of and social roles for LGBT people varied across tribes. In the reservation era, Christian missionaries and European government agencies denounced homosexuality and gender variance, forcing LGBT people to adopt social roles and dress considered appropriate, such as making males cut their hair and making females wear dresses. Though the violence and intimidation enacted by the church and government were disproportionately directed at Native Americans, both Native and non-Native LGBT people often lived in hiding to avoid being incarcerated or killed because homosexuality was a criminal offense.

The first person known to describe himself as a drag queen was William Dorsey Swann, born enslaved in Hancock, Maryland. Swann was the first American on record who pursued legal and political action to defend the LGBTQ community's right to assemble. During the 1880s and 1890s, Swann organized a series of drag balls in Washington, D.C.. Swann was arrested in police raids numerous times, including in the first documented case of arrests for female impersonation in the United States, on April 12, 1888.

LGBT acceptance improved slowly in the 19th century and first half of the 20th century. There were more rapid changes with Gay Liberation in the 1960s and HIV/AIDS crisis activism in the 1980s. A number of writers, artists and entertainers publicly acknowledged their homosexuality. In the 1990s, the popular media began including gay characters.

Anti-sodomy laws were ruled unconstitutional in 2003, making it legal throughout the nation for consenting adults to have sex with a person of the same gender.

While the 1990s had seen the rise of social conservatism and two major federal restrictions on equality for gay people with the military's Don't Ask Don't Tell policy and the Defense of Marriage Act. "Don't Ask, Don't Tell" was dropped in 2011, and all prohibitions of same-sex marriage were dropped in 2015.

Official church positions on LGBT issues have been slower to change and mostly among mainstream Protestant denominations.

Communities

The Mattachine Society 
In 1950, a gay community in Los Angeles with communist ideals founded the movement "The Mattachine Society". It began in 1940 when a man named Harry Hay idealized the term homophile. "The Mattachine Society" originated the name "International Bachelors Fraternal Orders for Peace and Social Dignity." The new name was founded by the influence of European masked performers. The main goal of this movement was to go against discrimination and create a strong identity within the gay community. The goals started to change into assimilation instead of advocation and the group started to decline from being a national organization to smaller chapters in the 1950s.

The Lesbian Movement 

In 1955 in San Francisco, Del Martin and Phyllis Lyon founded Daughters of Bilitis, part of "the homophile movement," to create lesbian community. The organization was intended to be a safe space for lesbians and to advocate. It was influenced by The Mattachine Society and other groups.

In the early 1970s, lesbian activists created their own communities and institutions including self defense schools. Many of their activities were separate from the broader feminist movement and from the gay men's movement. In the late 1970s, the lesbian movement dwindled due to the economic recession, and it generally integrated with the broader gay movement. History of Gay Rights Movement in U.S.

Street Transvestite Action Revolutionaries 
Street Transvestite Action Revolutionaries was founded in 1970 by Sylvia Rivera and Marsha P. Johnson in New York City. They housed and fed LGBT street youth and sex workers, and advocated for social change for these communities.

Rights

LGBT rights in the US have evolved over time and vary on a state-by-state basis. Sexual acts between persons of the same sex have been legal nationwide in the US since 2003, pursuant to the U.S. Supreme Court ruling in Lawrence v. Texas.

Anti-discrimination laws vary by state. Same-sex marriage is legal in every state, pursuant to the U.S. Supreme Court ruling in Obergefell v. Hodges. Hate crimes based on sexual orientation or gender identity are also punishable by federal law under the Matthew Shepard and James Byrd, Jr. Hate Crimes Prevention Act of 2009.

Adoption policies in regards to gay and lesbian parents also vary greatly from state to state. Some allow adoption by same-sex couples, while others ban all "unmarried couples" from adoption.

Family rights after 1980 

With the withering and downfall of sodomy laws on a state-by-state basis after 1960, LGBT rights activists began to develop increasingly detailed demands and campaigns for legal equality at all levels of government, a process which has been incremental in each jurisdiction. In 1984, Berkeley, California became the first jurisdiction to recognize same-sex unions of any type (then in the form of domestic partnership health benefits for city employees). In 1999, California passed its domestic partnership law, becoming the first state to recognize same-sex unions; Vermont became the first state to legalize civil unions (often seen as a reduced version of full marriage rights).

However, following the Stonewall riots, the social conservative movement in the United States became increasingly defined by its opposition against rights for LGBT people. The most pre-eminent laws advocated at the federal level by social conservative politicians in the 1990s include Don't ask, don't tell, a continued restriction upon the service of LGBT persons in the United States Armed Forces, and the Defense of Marriage Act (DOMA), which defines marriage as a heterosexual-exclusive institution and bars the federal government from recognizing same-sex unions enacted by municipal, state or foreign governments. These were followed by the passage in the 2000s of state-level statutory and constitutional prohibitions of legal recognition of same-sex marriages or unions of any type.

However, a number of other states have legalized same-sex marriages or other unions, beginning with Massachusetts in 2004. That state was followed by Connecticut (2008), Iowa (2009), District of Columbia (2009), Vermont (2009), New Hampshire (2010) and New York (2011).

The most controversial moment in the history of the movement for same-sex marriage rights took place in California during the period from May 2008, when the State Supreme Court abrogated Proposition 22, which barred the state from legalizing same-sex marriage, as unconstitutional, to November 2008, when Proposition 8, a proposition against the court ruling brought by social conservatives, passed with 53% of the vote. Protests against the vote and its outcome ensued nationwide among pro-LGBT rights activists, media personalities and politicians, resulting in Perry v. Schwarzenegger, a federal lawsuit challenging the legality and constitutionality of Proposition 8. The decision by the judge of the case overturned Proposition 8, but the decision has been stayed pending appeal; the ultimate decision is likely to be made in the Supreme Court of the United States, as are two Massachusetts-sourced cases which challenge the constitutionality of DOMA. Meanwhile, some 18,000 same-sex marriages performed in California between May and November 2008 have retained their legality due to an earlier state trial case.

On June 26, 2015, the Supreme Court ruled in Obergefell v. Hodges that states must license and recognize same-sex marriages. Consequently, same-sex marriage is legal in all 50 states, the District of Columbia, Puerto Rico, Guam, U.S. Virgin Islands, and Northern Mariana Islands. Currently, same-sex marriages are neither licensed nor recognized in American Samoa, due to its unique constitutional status. The legal status of same-sex marriage also varies in Native American tribal nations, as their reservations are considered sovereign entities and were not affected by the Supreme Court's legalization in 2015.

In December 2022, the final version of the bill Respect for Marriage Act divided American religious groups morally opposed to same-sex marriage; it was supported by some as a suitable compromise between the rights of LGBT couples and religious liberty, a position that was taken by the Church of Jesus Christ of Latter-day Saints, but was prominently opposed by the U.S. Conference of Catholic Bishops and the Southern Baptist Convention due to their views on sexual ethics. Religious groups that supported the bill in support of their LGBT parishioners include the Episcopal Church, the Evangelical Lutheran Church in America, the Union for Reform Judaism, the Reformed Church in America, the United Church of Christ, and the Presbyterian Church (USA).

Hate crimes 
Even after the decriminalization of same-sex sexual activity, LGBT persons have continued to be targeted—violently and non-violently—by individuals who claim any degree of emotional or religious motivation for their crimes. This phenomenon has been variously attributed to the influence of institutional and authoritarian homophobia in various environments. The torture and murder of University of Wyoming student Matthew Shepard in 1998 became a rallying moment for activism against hate crimes, and the landmark Matthew Shepard and James Byrd, Jr. Hate Crimes Prevention Act was passed in 2009 under President Barack Obama; the Act was also the first federal legislation of any purpose to specifically refer to transgender persons. Anti-bullying and anti-hate crime movements increasingly focus on bias against sexual orientation and gender identity.

The Hate Crime Statistics Act of 1990 required data collection about crimes motivated by biases that included "sexual orientation." Since then, the FBI has produced an annual report with relevant statistics. In 2013, the FBI's hate crime report began separately considering bias against "gender identity" and "gender" for the first time.

National data collection can be complicated by inconsistent reporting requirements on the state level. For example, as of 2019, 37 states still do not have anti-bias statutes for crimes based on gender identity.

The FBI reports show that, throughout the 21st century, bias against sexual orientation has consistently accounted for between one-seventh and one-fifth of all reported incidents that were motivated by a single bias.

Violence

Violence against LGBT people in the US is made up of assaults on gay men, lesbians, bisexual, transgender, queer and intersex individuals (LGBTQI), legal responses to such violence, and hate crime statistics in the United States of America. Those targeted by such violence are perceived to violate heteronormative rules and contravene perceived protocols of gender and sexual roles. While this violence is sometimes narrowly termed homophobia or gay bashing, combating it is often understood as part of a broader struggle for human rights.

The Transgender Day of Remembrance is organized annually to honor transgender victims of murder.

Anti-bullying activism 
In 2009–2010, a number of suicides by teenage and young adult Americans in relation to sexual orientation- or gender expression-related bullying by fellow students garnered headlines, bringing to the fore a debate on bullying in schools and other environments. In response, Seattle-area opinion columnist and rights activist Dan Savage participated with his husband in the making of a video which encouraged children and teenagers to resist and overcome peer bullying, inaugurating an ongoing series of videos by politicians, media personalities, business leaders, activists and others both within and outside the United States listed under the "It Gets Better Project".

Interest groups 

The wide array of LGBT-related organizations in the United States includes National Center for Transgender Equality (NCTE), Parents, Families and Friends of Lesbians and Gays (PFLAG), Gay & Lesbian Alliance Against Defamation (GLAAD), Human Rights Campaign (HRC), National Gay and Lesbian Task Force (NGLTF or "the Task Force"), Empowering Spirits Foundation (Empowering Spirits or ESF), Gay & Lesbian Victory Fund, Safe Space America, Independent Gay Forum, and many local LGBT community centers.

Freedom to Marry was the leading advocate for same-sex marriage; the organization closed after same-sex marriage was legalized nationwide. Some of the original staff from Freedom to Marry moved to a new organization called Freedom for All Americans, which now seeks to "adapt the multi-level and multi-prong strategies" of the marriage equality movement to a movement for "a broader array of LGBT rights and protections," according to Courtenay W. Daum.

Support in schools 

Since the 1980s, "Gay Straight Alliance" organizations help students and teachers and provide resources to their institutions. Research has shown that LGBTQ adolescents feel safer and more included when they belong to these groups. High School Gay-Straight Alliances (GSAs) and Young Adult Well-Being: An Examination of GSA Presence, Participation, and Perceived Effectiveness - PMC

Religion 

Christian denominations that have long supported same-sex marriage include the Unitarian Universalist Association, the Episcopal Church, the Presbyterian Church (U.S.A.), the Reformed Church in America, the United Church of Christ, the Evangelical Lutheran Church in America, and the Metropolitan Community Church.

See also

Culture of the United States
Multiculturalism in the United States
Homelessness among LGBT youth in the United States
List of LGBT members of the United States Congress
LGBT culture in Miami
LGBT culture in New York City
LGBT history in the United States
LGBT movements in the United States
List of proposed anti-gay book bans in the United States
Same-sex marriage in the United States
Sodomy laws in the United States
Transgender rights in the United States

References

External links

 Gay & Lesbian Victory Fund and Leadership Institute
 Gay Marriages: Equality For All Americans
 GLAAD – Gay & Lesbian Alliance Against Defamation
 glsen.org Gay, Lesbian and Straight Education Network
 Human Rights Campaign
 National Gay and Lesbian Task Force
 Parents, Families & Friends of Lesbians & Gays
 LGBT Political Investment Caucus
 The Gay, Lesbian, Bisexual, Transgender Historical Society
 Lambda Legal Defense and Education Fund
 Dating website and Community Fund for the caribbean